Roger Douglas Congleton (born November 13, 1951) is an American economist. He serves as the BB&T Professor of Economics at West Virginia University and is the co-editor-in-chief of the journal Constitutional Political Economy.

Career
Congleton received his B.S., M.S., and Ph.D from Virginia Polytechnic Institute and State University. He previously taught at George Mason University, where he concurrently worked as a researcher at the Center for Study of Public Choice. Congleton has also held appointments at the University of Bayreuth and was a Fulbright Scholar in Odense.

References

External links
Personal website (research)

1951 births
21st-century American economists
Virginia Tech alumni
George Mason University faculty
West Virginia University faculty
Living people
Academic journal editors